Farkhor Air Base is a military air base located near the town of Farkhor in Tajikistan,  southeast of the capital Dushanbe. It is operated by the Indian Air Force in collaboration with the Tajik Air Force. Farkhor is India's first military base outside its territory.

History
In 1996–97, the Research and Analysis Wing (RAW) started negotiations with Tajikistan to use the Farkhor Air Base to transport high-altitude military supplies to the Afghan Northern Alliance, service their helicopters and gather intelligence. At that time, India operated a small military hospital in the Farkhor region. The hospital at Farkhor was used to treat Afghan Northern Alliance members injured in fighting with the Taliban, including military leader Ahmed Shah Massoud, who was rushed there after a suicide attack against him. 

In 2002, India acknowledged that it was setting up an air base in Farkhor. It was secured with assistance from Russia. The airbase was in a dilapidated condition and was not used since the 1980s. The Indian Government awarded a $10 million tender to a private builder in 2003 to restore the airbase by 2005.

After the builder defaulted, the Border Roads Organisation stepped in to complete the work. In 2006, India was considering deploying a squadron of MiG 29 aircraft at the base. Subsequently the base was operationalized by 2007.

Strategic location and geopolitical implications
The Farkhor Air Base would give the Indian military the required depth and range in seeking a larger role in the Indian Subcontinent and is a tangible manifestation of India's move to project its power in Central Asia.

See also
Geostrategy in Central Asia
Ayni Air Base

References 

Tajik Air Force
Aviation in Tajikistan
Airports in Tajikistan
Indian Overseas Military bases
Indian Air Force bases
Khatlon Region
Research and Analysis Wing
Military installations in Tajikistan
Soviet Air Force bases